Rosa dumalis, the glaucous dog rose, is a species of rose native to Europe and southwest Asia. Not all authorities accept it as distinct, with the Flora Europaea treating it as a synonym of Rosa canina. On the other hand, Plants of the World Online treats Rosa vosagiaca (accepted by Flora Europaea) as a synonym of Rosa dumalis.

It has long, bent thorns. It bears dark or light pink flowers in June and July. The hips are oval and quite soft.

References

Flora Europaea: Rosa dumalis
Huxley, A., ed. (1992). New RHS Dictionary of Gardening. Macmillan.

dumalis
Flora of Europe
Flora of Asia